Ceglédi Vasutas Sportegyesület, commonly referred to as Ceglédi VSE is a Hungarian sports club based in Cegléd, Pest County. It consists of multiple departments, namely football, athletics and wrestling. The team's colours are yellow and blue.

History
On 3 March 1935, Ceglédi Vasutas Sportegyesület ("Cegléd Railway Sports Association") was established on the initiative of railway station chief Dr. Gyula Stankaai, and officers Kornél Ginovszky and József Gámán. The adopted statutes set out the objectives of the new club, intended to further bring together the railway workers through sports. In the first year, 153 regular railwaymen and 98 family members became members of the club.

Members of the club would excel in various sports, with club wrestler József Gál becoming the first Hungarian world champions in lightweight at the 1950 World Wrestling Championships, as well as competing in the 1952 Summer Olympics. At the 1952 Summer Olympics, club pentathlon athlete István Szondy received a gold medal in the team modern pentathlon event and a bronze in the individual event. In recent times, wrestler Tamás Lőrincz from the club won the silver medal at the 2012 Summer Olympics in the Greco-Roman 66 kg event and a gold medal in the men's 77 kg event at the 2020 Summer Olympics held in Tokyo, Japan.

In the footballing department, Ceglédi VSE has experienced modest success, achieving promotion in the 2006–07 season as champions of its third division season.

References

External links 
  
 Soccerway

 
Football clubs in Hungary
Association football clubs established in 1935
1935 establishments in Hungary